Sipjabong is a South Korean mountain between the cities of Wonju, Gangwon-do and Jecheon, Chungcheongbuk-do.

See also
 List of mountains in Korea

Notes

References
 

Mountains of South Korea
Wonju
Jecheon
Mountains of North Chungcheong Province
Mountains of Gangwon Province, South Korea